Henry Ruxton Woudhuysen,  (born 24 October 1954), is a British academic specialising in Renaissance English literature. He is the Rector of Lincoln College, Oxford, having been appointed in 2012. He was previously Dean of the Faculty of Arts and Humanities at University College London.

Woudhuysen was educated at St. Paul's School, London and gained a DPhil degree from the University of Oxford in 1981. His thesis title was Leicester's literary patronage: A study of the English court, 1578–1582.

In 2010, Woudhuysen was elected a Fellow of the British Academy (FBA), the United Kingdom's national academy for the humanities and social sciences.

References

External links
 Lincoln College biography
 Full text of his doctoral thesis via Oxford Research Archive

Rectors of Lincoln College, Oxford
Academics of the University of Oxford
Living people
Academics of University College London
Fellows of the British Academy
1954 births
Fellows of the Society of Antiquaries of London